The 2007 West Lancashire District Council election took place on 3 May 2007 to elect members of  West Lancashire District Council in Lancashire, England. One third of the council was up for election and the Conservative party stayed in overall control of the council.

After the election, the composition of the council was:

Background
Before the election the Conservatives had a 10-seat majority over Labour, after gaining 3 seats in the 2006 election. 19 seats were being contested in the election with the Conservative leader of the council, Geoff Roberts, being one of those who were defending seats. The election was seen as mainly being fought just between the Conservative and Labour parties, with the Liberal Democrats only standing in 2 wards.

The Conservatives were expected to remain in control of the council and were targeting the wards of Scott and Wrightington where Labour only had small majorities.

Election result
The Conservatives held control of the council after making a net gain of 1 seat to have a majority of 12 over Labour. They gained the seats of Scott and Wrightington from Labour, but lost Bickerstaffe back to Labour. Overall turnout in the election was 31.5%, down from the 32.2% recorded in 2006.

Ward results

Ashurst

Aughton and Downholland

Aughton Park

Bickerstaffe

Birch Green

Derby

Digmoor

Knowsley

Newburgh

North Meols

Parbold

Scarisbrick

Scott

Skelmersdale North

Skelmersdale South

Tanhouse

Tarleton

Up Holland

Wrightington

References

2007 English local elections
2007
2000s in Lancashire